Free Composition (Der freie Satz) is a treatise by Heinrich Schenker, and possibly Schenker's best known work. The third volume of New Musical Theories and Fantasies (preceded by Harmony and Counterpoint), it was first published posthumously by Universal Edition in Vienna in 1935. A second German edition by Oswald Jonas appeared in Vienna in 1956. The American translation by Ernst Oster was published by Longman, New York and London, in 1979.

Free Composition is often believed to present a complete and systematic outline of Schenker's mature theory, but it relies heavily on his previous writings, especially Der Tonwille (English translation, OUP, 2004) and Das Meisterwerk in der Musik (The Masterwork in Music, English translation, OUP, 1997) and cannot be fully appreciated without some knowledge of these publications.

The word Satz does not easily translate in English. "Free composition" apparently implies that there may exist a "strict composition", but Schenker considered that composition, by definition, is free, as opposed to strict counterpoint. The French translation proposes L'Écriture libre ("Free writing"). Neither solution is entirely satisfactory.

Free Composition consists of two volumes, one volume of text and one of musical examples. It is divided into three parts, dealing respectively with background, middleground, and foreground levels of structure. The last chapters of Part III are devoted to Meter and Rhythm and to Form.

See also
Free counterpoint

References

Sources 
Der freie Satz, Wien, Universal Edition, 1935. UE 6869. 2 vols. XXII+240 pp. and [IV]+119 pp.
Der freie Satz, 2d edition, edited and revised by O. Jonas, Wien, Universal Edition, 1956. UE 6869a. 2 vols. 240 pp. and [IV]+119 pp.
Der freie Satz, translation by Theodore Krueger, Ph.D. dissertation, State University of Iowa, 1960.
Free Composition, 2d edition, translated and edited by E. Oster, New York, Longman, 1979. 2 vols. XXIV+166 pp. and VIII+[119] pp., 
Free Composition, Macmillan, 1979 
Free Composition, Schirmer Books, 1993, 
Free Composition, translated and edited by E. Oster, Pendragon Press 2001 
L'Écriture libre, 2d edition, translated by N. Meeùs, Liège, Mardaga, 1993.  and 
[Free Composition], Chinese translation by Chen, Shi-Ben, Beijing: People’s Music Publications, 1997. 
Свободное сочинение [Der freie Satz], 2d edition, Russian translation by B. Plotnikov, Krasnoyarsk Academy of Music and Theatre, 2004.

Schenkerian analysis